The Association of Private Enterprise Education is a nonprofit organization.

It was founded by a philanthropic donation from Herman Lay, co-founder of Frito-Lay, a subsidiary of PepsiCo.
It was created for the purpose of "studying and supporting the system of private enterprise". It aims "to put into action accurate and objective understandings of private enterprise".

It holds an annual conference.

It also publishes the Journal of Private Enterprise.

It also recognizes, by means of a number of awards, persons of distinction who have helped to further its aims.

Former presidents
 Edward Stringham
 Benjamin Powell
 Jeff Ray Clark
 Bruce L. Benson
 Michael Cox
 Bruce Yandle
 Jane Shaw
 Gordon Tullock

References

External links 
 The Association of Private Enterprise Education
 Organizational Profile – National Center for Charitable Statistics (Urban Institute)

Educational organizations based in the United States
Libertarian organizations based in the United States